Planning Policy Statement 1: Delivering Sustainable Development commonly abbreviated as PPS 1, is a document produced by the British Government to advise Local planning authorities on the delivery of sustainable development through the planning system. The current version was introduced in February 2005 and replaced Planning Policy Guidance (PPG) Note 1, General Policies and Principles, published in February 1997.

See also
Planning Policy Statements
Town and country planning in the United Kingdom
Planning and Compulsory Purchase Act 2004

United Kingdom planning policy